Conor Shanosky (born December 13, 1991) is a former American professional soccer player who played as a defender.

Early life
Shanosky was born in Pittsburgh, Pennsylvania; he grew up in Sterling, Virginia.

Professional career

D.C. United 
Shanosky signed a professional contract with D.C. United on August 13, 2010, after having previously signed to play soccer for George Mason University. He was one of four players to sign homegrown player contracts with D.C. United from their academy system, the other three being Ethan White, Andy Najar, and Bill Hamid. He was not eligible to play in any matches during the 2010 season.

On July 19, 2011 Shanosky joined USL Pro club Harrisburg City Islanders on loan. On March 2, 2012 the Fort Lauderdale Strikers of the North American Soccer League announced the signing of Shanosky on a season-long loan. On March 19, 2013, Shanosky was loaned to United's USL Pro affiliate Richmond Kickers for the 2013 season.

Shanosky left D.C. United in 2015 after making a total of 6 appearances for the club.

Louisville City 
Shanosky signed with Louisville City FC of USL Pro on January 21, 2015. During the 2015 season he made  28 appearances for the club and scored three goals. During the next season, Shanosky made 15 appearances for the club and scored one goal before leaving the club midseason to rejoin the Richmond Kickers. Shanosky played 3,267 minutes in his time with Louisville.

Richmond Kickers 
On September 2, 2016, Shanosky resigned with the Richmond Kickers on a permanent deal, he had previously spent time with the club on loan from D.C. United.  During the 2016 season he made four appearances for the team. During the 2017 season Shanosky made 18 appearances and scored one goal for the Kickers. During the 2018 season, Shanosky played 24 games for the Kickers without scoring any goals.

In 2019 the Kickers announced that they would move from the USL Championship to USL League One, becoming founding members of the new third division. Shanosky re-signed with Richmond on February 20, 2019 ahead of the club's inaugural USL League One campaign. During the 2019 season Shanosky made 22 appearances for the Kickers and scored one goal as the club finished in 9th place. On August 6, 2020, Richmond mutually agreed to terminate Shanosky's contract. Darren Sawatzky stated on the "League One Fun" podcast that Shanosky was moving to Scotland with Megan Crosson, his girlfriend, who had signed with Celtic F.C. Sawatzky stated that he believed that Shanosky would either tryout for teams in Scotland or try to coach because he has his USSF C coaching license.

Shanosky finished his career with Richmond making 72 appearances, scoring two goals, and making three assists.

Career statistics

International career
Shanosky was a member of the United States Men's U-20 team that won the 2010 Milk Cup in Northern Ireland, where he played in three games.

References

External links
 
 

1991 births
Living people
American soccer players
Association football defenders
D.C. United players
Fort Lauderdale Strikers players
Homegrown Players (MLS)
Louisville City FC players
Major League Soccer players
North American Soccer League players
Penn FC players
People from Sterling, Virginia
Richmond Kickers players
Soccer players from Virginia
USL Championship players
USL League One players
United States men's under-20 international soccer players
Saint Leo University alumni